Roberto Pereira (born 23 September 1952) is a Cuban footballer. He competed at the 1976 Summer Olympics and the 1980 Summer Olympics.

References

External links
 

1952 births
Living people
People from Santo Domingo, Cuba
Cuban footballers
Cuba international footballers
Association football forwards
FC Villa Clara players
Olympic footballers of Cuba
Footballers at the 1976 Summer Olympics
Footballers at the 1980 Summer Olympics
Pan American Games medalists in football
Pan American Games silver medalists for Cuba
Footballers at the 1979 Pan American Games
Medalists at the 1979 Pan American Games